This is a comprehensive listing of Wallace Reid's (1891–1923) silent film output. Reid often played a clean-cut, well-groomed American go-getter on screen, which is how he is best remembered, but he could alternate with character roles, especially in his early short films, most of which are now lost. Some films have him as a director, some have him as an actor and some have him as both in particular his numerous short films. His first feature film is the famous appearance as a young blacksmith in The Birth of a Nation in 1915.

1910
 The Phoenix (1910) *short ...as Young Reporter

1911
 The Leading Lady (1911) *short
 The Reporter (1911) *short ...as Cohn, Jones' Assistant
 The Mother of the Ranch (1911) *short ...as The Mother's Friend back East
 War (1911) *short  ...as Midas

1912

 A Red Cross Martyr, or, On the Firing Lines of Tripoli (1912) *short
 The Path of True Love (1912) *short ...as The Country Boy
 Chumps (1912) *short ...as George, the Denouement
 Jean Intervenes (1912) *short ...as Billy Hallock
 Indian Romeo and Juliet (1912) *short ...as Oniatore/Romeo
 Playmates (1912) *short ...as Party Guest at Piano(uncredited)
 The Telephone Girl (1912) *short ...as Jack Watson
 The Seventh Son (1912) *short ...as One of the Beecham Brothers
 The Illumination (1912) *short ...as Giuseppe's Father
 At Scrogginses' Corner (1912) *short
 Brothers (1912) *short ...as Minor role
 The Victoria Cross (1912) *short ...as Lt. Cholmodeley
 The Hieroglyphic (1912) *short ...
 Fortunes of a Composer (1912) *short ...as Opera Attendee (uncredited)
 Diamond Cut Diamond (1912) *short ...as The Office Clerk
 Curfew Shall Not Ring Tonight (1912) *short ...as Basil Underwood
 His Mother's Son (1912) *short ...
 Kaintuck (1912) *short ...as The Artist
 Virginius (1912) *short ...as Icilius
 The Gamblers (1912) *short ...as Arthur Ingraham
 Before the White Man Came (1912) *short ...as Wathuma-the Leopard
 A Man's Duty (1912) *short ...as Dick Wilson-Union Soldier
 At Cripple Creek (1912) *short ...as Joe Mayfield
 Making Good (1912) *short ...as Billy Burns
 The Secret Service Man (1912) *short ...as The Secret Service Man
 The Indian Raiders (1912) *short ...as Tom
 His Only Son (1912) *short ...as Bob Madden
 Every Inch a Man (1912) *short ...as Robert Chapman-the Son
 Early Days in the West (1912) *short ...as Dan, a Young Pioneer
 Hunted Down (1912) *short ... as John Dayton
 A Daughter of the Redskins (1912) *short ...as Captain Stark, U.S.A.
 The Cowboy Guardians (1912) *short ...as 
 The Tribal Law (1912) *short ...as Tall Pine aka Jose Seville-Apache Brave (*directed)
 An Indian Outcast (1912) *short ...as Wally, a Cowboy
 The Hidden Treasure (1912) *short ...as Bill Binks (*directed)
 The Sepoy Rebellion (1912) *short ...as Extra (uncredited)

1913
 Love and the Law (1913)*short ...as Sheriff John Allen (*directed)
 Their Masterpiece (1913)*short ...as Jack Sanders
 Pirate Gold (1913)*short...
 The Rose of Old Mexico (1913)*short ...as Paul Hapgood (*directed)
 The Picture of Dorian Gray (1913)*short ...as Dorian Gray
 Near to Earth (1913)*short ...as
 The Eye of a God (1913)*short ...as Frank Hammond
 The Ways of Fate (1913)*short ... as Jim Conway (*directed)
 When Jim Returned (1913)*short ...as Jim (*directed)
 The Tattooed Arm (1913)*short ...as Ben Hart (*directed)
 The Brothers (1913)*short ...as Robert Gregory (*directed)
 The Deerslayer (1913)*short ...as Chingachgook
 Youth and Jealousy (1913)*short ...as Ben (*directed)
 The Kiss (1913)*short ...as Ralph Walters (*directed)
 Her Innocent Marriage (1913)*short ...as Will Wayne (*directed)
 A Modern Snare (1913)*short ...as Ralph-the New Sheriff (*directed)
 On the Border (1913)*short ...as Bill Reeves-the Cowboy (*directed)
 When Luck Changes (1913)*short ...as Cal Jim (*directed)
 Via Cabaret (1913)*short ...as Harry Reeder (*directed)
 The Spirit of the Flag (1913)*short ...as Dr. Reid
 Hearts and Horses (1913)*short ...as Bill Walters (*directed)
 In Love and War (1913)*short ...as David-the Journalist
 Women and War (1913)*short ...as The Boy
 The Guerilla Menace (1913)*short ...as Captain Bruce Douglas
 Calamity Anne Takes a Trip (1913)*short ...Policeman
 Song Bird of the North (1913)*short ...as Fowle-a Mission Worker
 Pride of Lonesome (1913)*short ...as Edward Daton (*directed)
 The Powder Flash of Death (1913)*short ...as Captain Bruce Douglas
 A Foreign Spy (1913)*short ... (*directed)
 The Picket Guard (1913)*short ...as Sentry
 Mental Suicide (1913)*short ...as Reid-a Contractor
 Man's Duty (1913)*short ...Bill, the Selfish One
 An Even Exchange (1913)*short ...as Joe
 The Animal (1913)*short ...as The Animal
 The Harvest of Flame (1913)*short ...as The Inspector (*directed)
 The Spark of Manhood (1913)*short ... (*directed)
 The Mystery of Yellow Aster Mine (1913)*short ...as Reid-Rosson's Brother
 The Gratitude of Wanda (1913)*short ...as Wally (*directed)
 The Wall of Money (1913)*short ...as Wallace-McQuarrie's Son
 The Heart of a Cracksman (1913)*short ...as Gentleman Crook (*directed)
 The Crackman's Reformation (1913)*short ...as Gentleman Crook
 The Fires of Fate (1913)*short ...as Wally-the Doctor (*directed)
 Cross Purposes (1913)*short ...as Wally (*directed)
 Retribution (1913)*short ...as Reid (*directed)
 A Cracksman Santa Claus (1913)*short ...as Gentleman Crook
 The Lightning Bolt (1913)*short ...as Reid (*directed)
 A Hopi Legend (1913)*short ... (*directed)

1914
 Whoso Diggeth a Pit (1914)*short ...as Wally
 The Intruder (1914 film)*short ...as The Woodsman (*directed)
 The Countess Betty's Mine (1914)*short ...as Wallace (*directed)
 The Wheel of Life (1914)*short ...as The Prospector (*directed)
 Fires of Conscience (1914)*short ...as Ray-The Prospector (*directed)
 The Greater Devotion (1914)*short ...as 'Devotion' (*directed)
 A Flash in the Dark (1914)*short ...as A Miner (*directed)
 Breed o' the Mountains (1914)*short ...as Joe Mayfield (*directed)
 Regeneration (1914)*short ... The Artist (*directed)
 The Voice of the Viola (1914)*short ...as Wallace (*directed)
 The Heart of the Hills (1914)*short ... The Woodsman (*directed)
 The Way of a Woman (1914)*short ...as Pierre (*directed)
 The Mountaineer (1914)*short ...as Jim-the Mountaineer (*directed)
 The Spider and Her Web (1914)*short ...

 Cupid Incognito (1914)*short ...as Jack Falkner (*directed)
 A Gypsy Romance (1914)*short ...as Jose-King of the Gypsies (*directed)
 The Test (1914)*short ...as The Poor Man (*directed, actor)
 The Skeleton (1914)*short ...as Jack-the Young Husband (*directed)
 The Fruit of Evil (1914)*short ... (*directed)
 The Daughter of a Crook (1914)*short ...as Neal
 Women and Roses (1914)*short ...as Wallace (*directed)
 The Quack (1914)*short ...as Wallace Rosslyn (*directed)
 The Siren (1914)*short ...as Dane Northrop (*directed)
 The Man Within (1914)*short ...as Wallace Rosslyn (*directed)
 Passing of the Beast (1914)*short ...as Jacques-the Woodsman (*directed)
 Love's Western Flight (1914)*short ...as Wally-the Ranch Owner (*directed)
 A Wife on a Wager (1914)*short ...as Wally Bristow (*directed)
  'Cross the Mexican Line  (1914)*short ... as Lt. Wallace (*directed)
 The Den of Thieves (1914)*short ...as Wallace (*directed)
 Arms and the Gringo (1914)*short ...as Sullivan
 The City Beautiful (1914)*short ...as The Country Boy
 Down by the Sounding Sea (1914)*short ...as John Ward-the Man from the Sea
 The Avenging Conscience (1914)*short ...as The Doctor(uncredited)
 Moonshine Molly (1914)*short ...as Lawson Keene
 The Second Mrs. Roebuck (1914)*short ...as Samuel Roebuck
 Sierra Jim's Reformation (1914)*short ...as Tim-the Pony Express Rider
 The High Grader (1914)*short ...as Dick Raleigh
 Down the Hill to Creditville (1914)*short ...as Marcus Down
 Her Awakening (1914)*short ...as Bob Turner
 Her Doggy (1914)*short ...as The Doctor
 For Her Father's Sins (1914)*short ...as Frank Bell
 A Mother's Influence (1914)*short ... as Wallace Burton-the Son
 Sheriff for an Hour (1914)*short ...as Jim Jones
 The Niggard (1914)*short ...as Elmer Kent
 The Odalisque (1914)*short ...as Curtiss
 The Little Country Mouse (1914)*short ...as Lieutenant Hawkhurst
 Another Chance (1914)*short ...Detective Flynn
 Over the Ledge (1914)*short ...as Bob
 At Dawn (1914)*short ...as The Lieutenant
 The Joke on Yellentown (1914)*short ...as 
 The Exposure (1914)*short ...as The Reporter
 Baby's Ride (1914)*short ...as Father

1915

 The Three Brothers (1915)*short ...as Jean Gaudet/Will
 The Craven (1915)*short ...as Bud Walton
 The Birth of a Nation ...as Jeff, the blacksmith
 The Lost House (1915)*short ...as Ford
 Enoch Arden (1915)*short ...as Phillip Ray
 Station Content (1915)*short ...as Jim Manning
 A Yankee from the West (1915) ...as Billy Milford aka Hell-in-the Mud
 The Chorus Lady (1915) ...as Danny Mallory
 Carmen (1915) ...as Don José
 Old Heidelberg (1915) ...as Prince Karl Heinrich
 The Golden Chance (1915) ...as Roger Manning

1916
To Have and to Hold (1916) ...as Captain Ralph Percy
The Love Mask (1916) ...as Dan Derring

Maria Rosa (1916) ...as Andreas
The Selfish Woman (1916) ...as Tom Morley
The House with the Golden Windows (1916) ...as Tom Wells
Intolerance (1916) ...as young man killed in battle (uncredited)
The Yellow Pawn (1916) ...as James Weldon
The Wall of Flame (1916)*short ...Wallace-the Fire Inspector
The Wrong Heart (1916)*short ... (*directed)

1917

Joan the Woman (1917) ...as Eric Trent 1431/Eric Trent 1917
The Golden Fetter (1917) ...as James Roger Ralston
The Man Who Saved the Day (1917)*short ...John King (*directed)
Buried Alive (1917)*short (*directed)
The Tell-Tale Arm (1917)*short
The Prison Without Walls (1917) ...as Huntington Babbs
A Warrior's Bride (1917)*short (*directed)
The Penalty of Silence (1917)*short (*directed)
The World Apart (1917) ...as Bob Fulton
Big Timber (1917) ...as Jack Fife
The Squaw Man's Son (1917) ...as Lord Effington, aka Hal
The Hostage (1917) ...as Lieutenant Kemper
The Woman God Forgot (1917) ...as Alvarado
Nan of Music Mountain (1917) ...as Henry de Spain
The Devil-Stone (1917) ...as Guy Sterling

1918

Rimrock Jones (1918) ...as Rimrock Jones
The Thing We Love (1918) ...as Rodney Sheridan
The House of Silence (1918) ...as Marcel Levington
Believe Me, Xantippe (1918) ...as George MacFarland
The Firefly of France (1918) ...as Devereux Bayne
Less Than Kin (1918) ...as Hobart Lee/Lewis Vickers
The Source (1918) ...as Van Twiller Yard
His Extra Bit (1918)*short ...
The Man from Funeral Range (1918) ...as Harry Webb
Too Many Millions (1918) ... as Walsingham Van Doren

1919

The Dub (1919) ...as John Craig (The 'Dub')
Alias Mike Moran (1919) ...as Larry Young
The Roaring Road (1919) ...as Walter Thomas 'Toodles' Walden
You're Fired (1919) ...as Billy Deering
The Love Burglar (1919) ...as David Strong
The Valley of the Giants (1919) ...as Bryce Cardigan
The Lottery Man (1919) ...as Jack Wright
Hawthorne of the U.S.A. (1919) ...as Anthony Hamilton Hawthorne

1920

Double Speed (1920) ...as 'Speed' Carr
Excuse My Dust (1920) ... as 'Toodles' Walden
The Dancin' Fool (1920) ...as Sylvester Tibble
Sick Abed (1920) ...as Reginald Jay
What's Your Hurry? (1920) ...as Dusty Rhoades
Always Audacious (1920) ...as Perry Dayton/ 'Slim' Attucks

1921

The Charm School (1921) ... as Austin Bevans
The Love Special (1921) ...Jim Glover
Too Much Speed (1921) ...as 'Dusty' Rhoades
The Hell Diggers (1921) ...as Teddy Darman
The Affairs of Anatol (1921) ...as Anatol Spencer
Forever (1921) ...as Peter Ibbetson
Don't Tell Everything (1921) ...as Cullen Dale

1922
Rent Free (1922) ...as Buell Arnister Jr
The World's Champion (1922) ...as William Burroughs
Across the Continent (1922) ...as Jimmy Dent
The Dictator (1922) ...as Brooke Travers
A Trip to Paramountown (1922)*short ...cameo;as himself
Nice People (1922) ...as Captain Billy Wade
The Ghost Breaker (1922) ...as Walter Jarvis, a Ghost Breaker
Clarence (1922) ...as Clarence Smith
Thirty Days (1922) ...as John Floyd
Night Life in Hollywood (1922) ...cameo;as himself
Hollywood (1923) ...cameo;as himself (posthumous release)

Director
Films for which Wallace Reid directs but does not appear in:
Where Destiny Guides (1913)*short
The Latent Spark (1913)*short
The Fugitive (1913)*short
When the Light Fades (1913)*short
Brother Love (1913)*short
The Orphan's Mine (1913)*short
The Renegade's Heart (1913)*short
The Mute Witness (1913)*short
The Homestead Race (1913)*short
Suspended Sentence (1913)*short
Dead Man's Shoes (1913)*short

References

External links
 Wallace Reid at IMDb.com

Reid, Wallace
American filmographies